Khotanan may refer to:
Nerkin Khotanan, Armenia
Verin Khotanan, Armenia